Francisco Javier Gómez Hernández (born May 20, 1967) is a Mexican football manager and former player. He played for Tigres UANL during the 1995-96 season.

References

External links
 abcdezihuatanejo.com
 

1967 births
Living people
Mexican footballers
Liga MX players
Mexican football managers
Association football defenders
Tigres UANL footballers
Club Puebla players
Sportspeople from León, Guanajuato
Footballers from Guanajuato